I'm Fine is the second album by singer-songwriter Patty Larkin. It was produced in 1987 and distributed by Philo Records.

Track listing
"Rescue Me"
"Justine"
"Window"
"Dangerous"
"I'm Fine"
"Pucker Up"
"Lately"
"On the Run"
"Don't Want to Give It Up"
"Island of Time"
"If I Were Made of Metal"
"Caffeine"
"Valentine"
"Day to Day"

All songs were written by Patty Larkin.

Personnel
 Patty Larkin – vocals, acoustic guitar, electric guitar, accordion
 Tony Allen – drums
 Robin Batteau – violin
 James Brough – synthesizer
 Richard Gates – bass, electric bass, backing vocals
 Cercie Miller – alto saxophone, soprano saxophone
 Chuck Parrish – electric guitar
 Rick Purro – percussion
 Tim Jackson – drums
 John Curtis – mandolin, 6 string and slide guitars
 Sheldon Mirowitz – synthesizer
 Catharine David – backing vocals
 Sheila Larkin – backing vocals
 Rodney Young – backing vocals
 Charlie Kirkland – backing vocals
 David Thomas – backing vocals
 Fred Griffith – backing vocals

References

Patty Larkin albums
1987 albums
Albums produced by Darleen Wilson